James McDermott (1846 - September 4, 1882) was an American baseball player in the first professional league. He played two games in the outfield for the 1871 Fort Wayne Kekiongas and seven games as pitcher for the 1872 Brooklyn Eckfords.

McDermott previously played for the Eckfords in the second of that club's professional seasons, 1870. While the team won 2, tied 1, and lost 12 pro matches, he was the regular pitcher. Overall, he appeared in 20 games on record, one behind the team leaders, and he was an ordinary batter in the company of his teammates.

References

External links

Major League Baseball pitchers
Brooklyn Eckfords (NABBP) players
Fort Wayne Kekiongas players
Brooklyn Eckfords players
19th-century baseball players
1846 births
1882 deaths
Burials at Holy Cross Cemetery, Brooklyn